Vishnu Vijayam is a 1974 Indian Malayalam-language film, directed by N. Sankaran Nair and produced by A. G. Abraham. The film stars Kamal Haasan, Sheela, Thikkurissy Sukumaran Nair and M. O. Devasya. The film has musical score by G. Devarajan.

J. Williams made his debut as an independent cameraman with this film. Vishnu Vijayam was dubbed in Telugu as Prema Poojari.

Plot 
Vishnu Vijayam, made in black and white is about a girl (Sheela) who is chased a boy (Kamal Haasan) who is engaged by her former lover (Amberish) to take a photograph of her extramarital affair to get money. This she gets to know in the end.

Cast 
 Kamal Haasan as Vishnu
 Sheela as Leela
 Ambareesh  as John
 Thikkurissy Sukumaran Nair as Kariachan
 M. O. Devasya
 Alummoodan as Chacko
 Girija
 Paravoor Bharathan as Unni's friend

Soundtrack 
The music was composed by G. Devarajan and the lyrics were written by Vayalar Ramavarma.

Release and reception 
Vishnu Vijayam was released on 25 October 1974. The film went on to become a blockbuster. The film was dubbed Telugu-language as Prema Poojari and released on 8 December 1978.

References

External links 
 

1970s Malayalam-language films
1974 films
Films scored by G. Devarajan
Films directed by N. Sankaran Nair